Jesse (1988) is a children's picture book written by Australian author Tim Winton and illustrated by Maureen Prichard.  It is the story of a small boy exploring the wild countryside beyond his garden gate - all alone.

Story 
When his parents are still sleeping Jesse puts on his gumboots and goes outside to explore. He goes beyond his own yard and out into the country side. He discovers the world beyond his own yard is both friendly and scary.  When darkness comes Jesse is lost but he is helped by other animals who lead him home.

Review 
A Montessori Book Review described Jesse as having an "unmistakably Australian landscape" with "lots of sensory details ,,, Lovely picture book that I think children from 2 or 3 up to early adolescence would enjoy thoroughly."

Awards 
1990 Winner Western Australian Premier's Book Awards: Children's Book

References 

1988 children's books
Australian picture books
Australian children's books